Diana's hogfish, Bodianus diana, is a species of wrasse native to the Indian Ocean from the African coast to the Nicobars and the Cocos-Keeling Islands. Reports of its presence in the western Pacific Ocean are erroneous. This species is of minor importance to local commercial fisheries and is found in the aquarium trade.

Habitat 
Diana's hogfish is generally found in the Indo-Pacific region including the Red Sea and East Africa towards the Marshall Islands. Juveniles have been observed living among the tentacles of the mushroom coral Heliofungia actiniformis.

Diet
Diana's hogfish feeds mainly on benthic invertebrates such as mollusks and crustaceans. Juveniles are known to remove parasites from other fishes.

Utilization 
This species is collected for the aquarium trade.

References

External links
 marinespecies.org

Fish of Thailand
Diana's hogfish
Taxa named by Bernard Germain de Lacépède 
Fish described in 1801